HD 63513 (HR 3036) is a solitary star located in the southern circumpolar constellation Volans. It has an apparent magnitude of 6.38, placing it near the max naked eye visibility.

This object is a star with the characteristics of a G6 and G8 giant. At present it has 3.14 times the mass of the Sun but has expanded to almost 13 times the Sun's girth. It shines at 102 solar luminosities from its enlarged photosphere at an effective temperature of 5,116 K, which gives it a yellow glow.

References

Volans (constellation)
G-type giants
063513
037773
Durchmusterung objects
3036
Volantis, 17